Buenos Aires District may refer to:
 Buenos Aires District, Picota, Peru
 Buenos Aires District, Morropón, Peru
 Buenos Aires District, Buenos Aires, Costa Rica